Fiamme Oro Rugby is the rugby union club section of the Italian State Police sport division Gruppo Sportivo Fiamme Oro. The Fiamme Oro are currently based in Rome and play in the Top 10, the first national league. Though since the club's foundation in the 1950s, the former Fiamme Oro Padova won both the Italian championship (5 times) and the Coppa Italia (4 times).

The club was established in 1955, founded by a group of policemen based in Padua (hence the name). The Fiamme Oro Padova won their first championship in 1958, which was followed by another the following season. The team also had a lot of success during the 1960s; winning the National championship in 1960, 1961 and 1968. In addition to their success with the National league, the club won the Coppa Italia in 1968 and 1969 and again in 1971 and 1972 as well.

In 1978, after their first relegation, the club were de facto discontinued although never officially disbanded and in 1985 were re-formed in Milan. The Italian Rugby Federation, because of club's successful past, allowed them to restart from 3rd division. In 1993 the club moved to Rome, and in 1998 rejoined the 1st division. Relegated again in 2000, in 2011 they returned in the Italian championship, where they currently play, and where they won their first Excellence Trophy in 2013–14.

Honours
 Italian championship
 Champions (5): 1957–58, 1958–59, 1959–60, 1960–61, 1967–68
 Coppa Italia
 Champions (4): 1967–68, 1968–69, 1970–71, 1971–72
 Excellence Trophy
 Champions (1): 2013–14
 Runners-Up (2): 2016–17, 2017–18

Current squad

Fiamme Oro squad for 2022–23 season:

Selected former players

Italian players
Former players who have played for Fiamme Oro Rugby and have caps for Italy:

 Anacleto Altigieri
 Andrea Bacchetti
 Arturo Bergamasco
 Ottorino Bettarello
 Carlo Canna
 Giancarlo Cucchiella
 Simone Favaro
 Nello Francescato
 Giovanni Licata
 Roberto Luise
 Giancarlo Navarrini
 Mario Piovan
 Pasquale Presutti
 Roberto Quartaroli
 Stefano Romagnoli
 Carlo Salmaso
 Michele Sepe
 Matteo Silini
 Luigi Troiani

See also
Gruppo Sportivo Fiamme Oro
Polizia di Stato
European Rugby Continental Shield

References

External links
 Official site

Italian rugby union teams
Rugby union in Rome
Gruppo Sportivo Fiamme Oro
Sports clubs in Rome
Rugby clubs established in 1955
1955 establishments in Italy